Teófilo Rodríguez Cazorla nicknamed "El Conejo" (Rabbit) (Porlamar, Isla de Margarita, August 16, 1971 – January 24, 2016) was a Venezuelan criminal, known for being the leader of the cartel called "Tren del Pacífico" (Train Pacific) and San Antonio Prison in Venezuela.

Biography 
El Conejo was born in Porlamar, Venezuela. As a child, he worked as a messenger for family, while his mother worked as a maid. Teófilo kept his job messenger to adulthood. During his time as a messenger, it was when he began performing his early work as a drug trafficker.

The boss of the prison 
At the time he was there and after position as the head of the prison, made a number of changes and constructions that drew international attention; pool, animals, church, boxing ring, restaurants, disco, rooms, among other facilities, over 150 firearms and large quantities of drugs within the prison compound.

Death 
On January 24, 2016, Teófilo was at a nightclub in Porlamar. On leaving the site, Teófilo and his companions were attacked with firearms when they were in a Toyota Corolla car. "El Conejo" was taken to a hospital, but died hours later as a result of gunshot wounds.

References

1971 births
2016 deaths
Venezuelan criminals